The fifth Sarawak state election was held between Wednesday, 15 April and Thursday, 16 April 1987 with a nomination date set on Monday, 6 April 1987. This was a snap election following the 'Ming Court' affair. The state assembly was dissolved on 12 March 1987 by Sarawak governor with the advice of chief minister of Sarawak, Abdul Taib Mahmud.

All the 48 Sarawak state assembly seats were contested. In this election, Sarawak Barisan Nasional (BN) fielded candidates for all 48 seats, PBDS for 21 seats, PERMAS for 21 seats, Democratic Action Party (DAP) for 11 seats, and Sarawak Democratik Bersatu (BERSATU) for one seat. There were 16 independents contesting for the seats. There were a total of 118 candidates vying for the seats, which was the lowest since 1979 election. A total of 625,270 voters were eligible to cast their votes.

Background

This snap election was called by Taib due to heightening of Ming court affair political crisis when Abdul Rahman Ya'kub together with 27 other state assemblymen signed a letter to call for Taib's resignation. Abdul Rahman formed a new political party named Persatuan Rakyat Malaysia Sarawak (PERMAS) just before the election. Together with Parti Bansa Dayak Sarawak (PBDS), Abdul Rahman would form an opposition alliance to challenge Taib at the polls.

Results

Summary

Results by constituency
Sarawak BN, composed of Parti Pesaka Bumiputera Bersatu (PBB), Sarawak United Peoples' Party (SUPP), and Sarawak National Party (SNAP),  won 28 out of 48 seats on the election day, thus able to form a government with a simple majority.

The full list of representatives is shown below:

See also
 Elections in Sarawak
 1987 Ming Court Affair
 List of Malaysian State Assembly Representatives (1986–1990)

References

1987
1987 elections in Malaysia